Fort Bend County is a county located in the U.S. state of Texas. The county was founded in 1837 and organized the next year. It is named for a blockhouse at a bend of the Brazos River. The community developed around the fort in early days.The county seat is Richmond,and features other prominent cities such as Rosenberg which was named after a Swiss Emigrant.

The largest city located entirely within the county borders is Sugar Land. The largest city by population in the county is Houston; however, most of Houston's population is located in neighboring Harris County.

Fort Bend County is included in the Houston–The Woodlands–Sugar Land metropolitan statistical area. As of the 2020 census, the population was 822,779. In 2017, Forbes ranked it the fifth-fastest growing county in the United States. 

In 2015, Fort Bend County became Texas's wealthiest county, with a median household income of $95,389 and a median family income of $105,944, surpassing Collin and Rockwall Counties since the 2000 census.

History
Before European settlement, the area was inhabited by Karankawa Indians. Spanish colonists generally did not reach the area during their colonization, settling more in South Texas.

After Mexico achieved independence from Spain, Anglo-Americans started entering from the east. In 1822, a group of Stephen F. Austin's colonists, headed by William Travis, built a fort at the present site of Richmond. The fort was called Fort Bend because it was built in the bend of the Brazos River. The city of Richmond was incorporated under the Republic of Texas along with 19 other towns in 1837. Fort Bend County was created from parts of Austin, Harris, and Brazoria Counties in 1838.

Fort Bend developed a plantation economy based on cotton as the commodity crop. Planters had numerous African-American slaves as laborers. By the 1850s, Fort Bend was one of six majority-black counties in Texas. In 1860, the slave population totaled 4,127, more than twice that of the 2,016 whites. Few free Blacks lived there, as Texas refused them entry.

While the area began to attract white immigrants in the late 19th century, it remained majority-Black during and after Reconstruction. Whites endeavored to control freedmen and their descendants through violence and intimidation. Freedmen and their sympathizers supported the Republican Party because of emancipation, electing their candidates to office. The state legislature was still predominately white. By the 1880s, most white residents belonged to the Democratic Party. Factional tensions were fierce, as political elements split largely along racial lines. The Jaybirds, representing the majority of the Whites, struggled to regain control from the Woodpeckers, who were made up of some whites who were consistently elected to office by the majority of African Americans, as several had served as Republican officials during Reconstruction.

Fort Bend County was the site of the Jaybird–Woodpecker War in 1888–89. After a few murders were committed, the political feud culminated in a gun battle at the courthouse on August 16, 1889, when several more people were killed and the Woodpeckers were routed from the county seat.

Governor Lawrence Sullivan Ross sent in militia forces and declared martial law. With his support, the Jaybirds ordered a list of certain Blacks and Woodpecker officials out of the county, overthrowing the local government. The Jaybirds took over county offices and established a "White-only pre-primary," disenfranchising African Americans from the only competitive contests in the county. This device lasted until 1950, when Willie Melton and Arizona Fleming won a lawsuit against the practice in United States District Court, though it was overturned on appeal. In 1953, they ultimately won their suit when the Supreme Court of the United States declared the Jaybird primary unconstitutional in Terry v. Adams, the last of the white primary cases.

20th century to present
In the middle 1950s, Fort Bend and neighboring Galveston County were plagued by organized crime, which was involved with brothels and illegal casinos. Editor Clymer Wright of the Fort Bend Reporter joined with state officials and the Texas Rangers to rid the area of such corruption. Wright defied death threats to report on the issues and clean up the community. He soon sold his paper, now known as the Fort Bend Herald and Texas Coaster.

In the 1960s, the first of several master-planned communities that came to define the county were developed, marking the beginning of its transformation from a largely rural county dominated by railroad and oil and gas interests to a major suburban county dominated by service and manufacturing industries. Among the earliest such developments were Sugar Land's Sugar Creek and Missouri City's Quail Valley, whose golf course hosted the Houston Open during the 1973 and 1974 seasons of the PGA Tour. Another was First Colony in Sugar Land, a 9,700-acre development commenced in the 1970s by Houston developer Gerald D. Hines that eventually became the southwest Greater Houston area's main retail hub, anchored by First Colony Mall and Sugar Land Town Square.

Since the 1980s, new communities have continued to develop, with Greatwood, New Territory, and Sienna (originally Sienna Plantation) among the more recent notable developments. In addition to continued development in the eastern part of the county around Sugar Land and Missouri City, the Greater Katy area began to experience rapid growth and expansion into Fort Bend County in the 1990s, led by the development of Cinco Ranch. By 2010, the county's population exceeded 500,000, and it had become the second-largest county in the greater Houston area (behind Harris County).

In 2017, Hurricane Harvey caused significant flooding in Fort Bend County, leading to the evacuation of 200,000 residents and over 10,000 rescues. The unprecedented flooding, the result of record rainfall and overflow from the Brazos River and Barker Reservoir, resulted in damage to or destruction of over 6,800 homes in the county.

Geography

Adjacent counties
 Waller County (north)
 Harris County (northeast)
 Brazoria County (southeast)
 Wharton County (southwest)
 Austin County (northwest)

Communities

Cities (multiple counties)
 Houston (mostly in Harris County and a small part in Montgomery County)
 Katy (partly in Harris and Waller Counties)
 Missouri City (small part in Harris County)
 Pearland (mostly in Brazoria County and a small part in Harris County)
 Stafford (small part in Harris County)

Cities

 Arcola
 Beasley
 Fulshear
 Kendleton
 Meadows Place
 Needville
 Orchard
 Richmond (county seat)
 Rosenberg
 Simonton
 Sugar Land
 Weston Lakes

Town
 Thompsons

Villages
 Fairchilds
 Pleak

Census-designated places

 Cinco Ranch (small part in Harris County)
 Cumings
 Fifth Street
 Four Corners
 Fresno
 Greatwood
 Mission Bend (partly in Harris County)
 New Territory
 Pecan Grove
 Sienna Plantation

Unincorporated communities

 Booth
 Crabb
 Clodine
 Foster
 Guy
 Juliff
 Long Point
 Pecan Hill
 Powell Point
 Riverstone
 Tavener

Ghost towns
 Duke
 Pittsville

Demographics
From 1930 to 1950, the county showed a decline in the rate of expansion and even a decrease in population. This was a period when many African Americans migrated in the second wave of the Great Migration from Texas and other parts of the South to the West Coast, where a buildup in the defense industry provided more job opportunities. Other minorities settled in the county during its residential development, and African Americans are now a minority.

Note: the U.S. Census Bureau treats Hispanic/Latino as an ethnic category. This table excludes Latinos from the racial categories and assigns them to a separate category. Hispanics/Latinos can be of any race.

As of the census of 2000, 354,452 people, 110,915 households, and 93,057 families resided in the county. The population density was 405 people per square mile (156/km2). The 115,991 housing units averaged 133 per square mile (51/km2). The racial or ethnic makeup of the county was 56.96% White (46.21% White non-Hispanic), 19.85% Black or African American, 0.30% Native American, 11.20% Asian, 0.04% Pacific Islander, 9.10% from other races, and 2.56% from two or more races. About 21.12% of the population were Hispanic or Latino of any race. Other self-identifications were 8.8% of German ancestry, 6.3% American, and 5.8% English ancestry.

In 2000, of the 110,915 households, 49.80% had children under the age of 18 living with them, 68.80% were married couples living together, 11.40% had a female householder with no husband present, and 16.10% were not families. About 13.50% of all households were made up of individuals, and 3.10% had someone living alone who was 65 years of age or older. The average household size was 3.14, and the average family size was 3.46.

In the county, the age distribution of the population was 32.00% under the age of 18, 7.60% from 18 to 24, 32.30% from 25 to 44, 22.40% from 45 to 64, and 5.70% who were 65 years of age or older. The median age was 33 years. For every 100 females, there were 99.10 males. For every 100 females age 18 and over, there were 96.30 males.

Ethnic backgrounds
Since the 1970s, Fort Bend County has been attracting people from all ethnic backgrounds. According to a 2001 Claritas study, it was the fifth-most diverse U.S. county, among counties with a population of 100,000 or more.

It is one of a growing number of U.S. counties with an ethnic plurality, with no single ethnic group forming a majority of the population. Fort Bend County also has the highest percentage of Asian Americans in the Southern United States; the largest groups are of Vietnamese, Chinese, Indian, and Filipino ancestry. By 2011, Fort Bend was ranked the fourth-most racially diverse county in the United States by USA Today. The newspaper based the ranking on calculating the probability that two persons selected at random would be of different ethnic groups or races. According to the USA Today methodology, the chance of people of being two different ethnic groups/races being selected was 75%. Karl Eschbach, a former demographer with the State of Texas, has said that many people from Houston neighborhoods and communities with clear racial identities, such as the East End, Sunnyside, and the Third Ward, moved to suburban areas that were too new to have established racial identities. Eschbach explained, "[a]s a large minority middle class started to emerge, Fort Bend was virgin territory that all groups could move to."

In 2020 Fort Bend County had the highest percentage of Asian Americans of any county in Texas. In 2019 Indian Americans make up almost 50% of the Asian Americans in the county, with the second and third largest subsets being Chinese Americans and Vietnamese Americans. From 2010 to 2020 the percentage of non-Hispanic white people declined by 4.8%, the Asian American community grew by 83,167 (83.7% increase), the percentage of Hispanic people increased by 42.9% and the percentage of black people increased by 35.9%.

Economic characteristics
According to the 2008 American Community Survey, the median income for a household in the county was $81,456, and for a family was $90,171. Males had a median income of $54,139 versus $41,353 for females. The per capita income for the county was $30,862. About 5.50% of families and 7.10% of the population were below the poverty line, including 8.50% of those under age 18 and 9.40% of those age 65 or over.

As of 2006, Fort Bend County is the wealthiest county in Texas, with a median household income of $95,389 and a median family income of $105,944, having surpassed Collin and Rockwall Counties since the 2000 census. However, the Council for Community and Economic Research ranked Fort Bend County America's third-wealthiest county when the local cost of living was factored in.

This estimate does not include property taxes and local taxes, as effective tax rates and home insurance were not measured. Along with other Texas counties, Fort Bend County has one of the nation's highest property-tax rates. In 2007, it was ranked fifth in the nation for property taxes as a percentage of the homes' value on owner-occupied housing. The list includes only counties with a population over 65,000. Fort Bend County also ranked in the top 100 in property taxes paid and percentage of taxes of income. Part of this is due to Texas's complex Robin Hood plan school financing law.

Government and politics
County politics in Fort Bend County, as in all Texas counties, center around a commissioners' court. It is composed of four popularly elected county commissioners, one representing each precinct drawn decennially on the basis of population, and a county judge elected to represent the entire county. Other county officials include a sheriff, district attorney, tax assessor-collector, county clerk, district clerk, county treasurer, and county attorney. 

For decades, Fort Bend County was a stronghold for the Democratic Party, having achieved disenfranchisement of Blacks at the county level in 1889 in the aftermath of the Jaybird–Woodpecker War. The state effectively disfranchised them with a poll tax and White primaries; the latter device was declared unconstitutional in 1944. By 1960, so few Republicans resided in Fort Bend County that the county's Republican chair once received a letter addressed simply to "Mr. Republican".

As the 1960s progressed, though, rapid suburban-style development in west and southwest Houston began to overflow into Fort Bend County, where the development of numerous master-planned communities attracted many upper-middle-class families to developments in the eastern portion of the county. This development, along with the shift of conservative white Democrats towards the Republican Party in the wake of the Voting Rights Act of 1965, led to increased support for the GOP in the following years. Richard Nixon narrowly carried the county in 1968, making it the only county in greater Houston outside of Harris County to go Republican that year, and carried it again in 1972. In 1976, conservative physician Ron Paul of Brazoria County, noted for his opposition to most government programs, which earned him the nickname "Dr. No",  captured the 22nd district in the United States House of Representatives in a special election, before narrowly losing re-election in the November election in which Gerald Ford also won Fort Bend, despite losing Texas to Jimmy Carter.

Beginning in 1978, Republicans began to win several offices within the county, with William P. Clements carrying the county in his successful run for governor. That same year, Paul was returned to Congress, while businessman Tom DeLay captured the county's seat in the Texas House of Representatives. In 1984 DeLay succeeded Paul in Congress after the latter ran an unsuccessful U.S. Senate campaign, and became House majority leader by 2002. Beginning in 1982, Republicans won a number of county-level offices and judicial benches, and Fort Bend County's new reputation as a Republican stronghold culminated in the 1994 election of a Republican county judge to the commissioners' court for the first time since Reconstruction. As of 2019, five of Fort Bend County's eight countywide offices, including two precinct-level positions, are held by Republicans. The remaining three are held by Democrats.

With growing populations of minorities and more socially moderate suburban voters who often break Republican on fiscal and economic issues, Fort Bend County has recently become more competitive. In 2008, Democrat Barack Obama came very close to winning the county, with 48.6% of the vote to Republican John McCain's 50.9%. In 2016, Hillary Clinton became the first Democrat to carry the county since Lyndon B. Johnson in 1964, largely due to the unpopularity of Republican nominee Donald Trump, with many voters splitting their tickets between Clinton and Republicans for other offices; Republicans won every elected countywide office by a margin similar to Clinton's, while also defeating an incumbent Democrat on the Fort Bend County Commissioners' Court. In 2018, significant enthusiasm for U.S. Senate candidate Beto O' Rourke and strong Democratic infrastructure resulted in Democratic control of the commissioners' court (including county judge) and a number of countywide administrative and judicial posts, with Fort Bend Independent School District board trustee K.P. George becoming Texas's first Asian-American county judge.

Today, Fort Bend County is often considered a swing county, with election results usually tilting more Democratic than statewide results, which almost always favor Republicans nowadays. Elections within the county are often decided by margins in more Republican-leaning areas in Sugar Land, Rosenberg, and southern Missouri City, with Republicans dominating in the Katy, Fulshear, and rural southern areas of the county and Democrats in the county's northeast corner around northern Missouri City and Fresno, as well as heavily Hispanic Mission Bend.

Since the passage of the Voting Rights Act of 1965, the federal government has enforced it by regularly reviewing voting patterns and local practices, and plaintiffs have sometimes sued state or local governments over discriminatory practices. In April 2009, as part of a settlement with the United States Department of Justice, officials of Fort Bend County agreed to increase assistance to Spanish-speaking Latino voters in elections held in the county.

Commissioners' court

County officials

United States Congress

Texas Legislature

Texas Senate

Texas House of Representatives

Corrections
The Fort Bend County Jail is at 1410 Richmond Parkway in Richmond.

Texas Department of Criminal Justice operates the following facilities in Fort Bend County, all at the Jester State Prison Farm site:

Prisons for men:
 Jester III Unit (unincorporated area) (co-located with the Jester units)
 Carol Vance Unit (unincorporated area) (co-located with the Jester units)

Other facilities:
 Jester I Unit – Substance Abuse Felony Punishment Facility (unincorporated area) (co-located with the Jester units)
 Wayne Scott Unit (formerly Jester IV Unit) – Psychiatric Facility (unincorporated area) (co-located with the Jester units), renamed in 2021

The TDCJ announced that the Central Unit in Sugar Land was closing in 2011. The City of Sugar Land is exploring the property for future economic development, including light industrial uses, as well as a potential expansion of Sugar Land Regional Airport.

County buildings

Economy
In contrast to greater Houston in general, Fort Bend County's economy is more diverse, with numerous service-sector jobs in healthcare, energy, education, hospitality, and other areas. Major companies with a presence in the county include Schlumberger, Minute Maid, Fluor, and Sunoco's logistics operations in Sugar Land. The Houston Business Journal reported in 2010 that the diversity of industries promoted decades of rapid population growth. After Memorial Hermann Hospital and St. Luke's Episcopal Hospital opened facilities in Fort Bend County, already home to local facilities for Houston Methodist Hospital in Sugar Land, as well as locally based OakBend Medical Center in Richmond, many doctors moved their offices to the county. Compared to Montgomery County, which has experienced rapid growth in corporate employment following ExxonMobil's decision to move its greater Houston operations to an area directly south of The Woodlands, Fort Bend County has yet to experience significant corporate growth,  though Schlumberger recently announced plans to move its North American headquarters to Sugar Land.

Healthcare
The county does not have a hospital district. OakBend Medical Center serves as the county's charity hospital which the county contracts with.

Education

Public school districts
School districts in the county include:
 Brazos Independent School District (formerly Wallis-Orchard ISD)
 Fort Bend Independent School District
 Katy Independent School District
 Lamar Consolidated Independent School District
 Needville Independent School District
 Stafford Municipal School District

Kendleton Independent School District, which formerly served parts of the county, closed in 2010 and merged into LCISD.

Higher education
 University of Houston Sugar Land campus

The Texas Legislature assigns these community college districts to the following:
 Houston Community College System: Katy ISD, Stafford MSD, and portions of FBISD in the Houston, Missouri City, and Pearland city limits
 Wharton County Junior College: The City of Sugar Land and its extraterritorial jurisdiction, Lamar CISD (including the former Kendleton ISD), Needville ISD, and Brazos ISD (stated in the legislation as Wallis-Orchard)
The legislation does not specify which community college district is for portions of FBISD outside of Sugarland and its ETJ and the cities of Houston, Missouri City, and Pearland.

Technical school
 Texas State Technical College

Libraries
Fort Bend County Libraries operates many libraries in the county.

Houston Public Library operates one branch in the county, the Stimley Blue Ridge Neighborhood Library in Blue Ridge, Houston.

Media
Local newspapers in the county include three weeklies: the Fort Bend Star, headquartered in Stafford; the Fort Bend Independent; and the Fort Bend Sun, headquartered in Sugar Land. The daily Fort Bend Herald and Texas Coaster focuses on news coverage in the Richmond-Rosenberg area. Fort Bend County is also a major service area for the Houston Chronicle, which provides separate local coverage for the Sugar Land and Katy areas.

Transportation

Major highways

  Interstate 10
  Interstate 69 (Under Construction)
  U.S. Route 59
  U.S. Route 90 Alternate
  State Highway 6
  State Highway 36
  State Highway 99 — Grand Parkway (Under Construction)
  Fort Bend Parkway
  Westpark Tollway

Major Farm to Market Roads

  Farm to Market Road 359
  Farm to Market Road 442
  Farm to Market Road 521
  Farm to Market Road 762
  Farm to Market Road 1092
  Farm to Market Road 1093
  Farm to Market Road 1464
  Farm to Market Road 1876
  Farm to Market Road 2234
  Farm to Market Road 2759
  Farm to Market Road 2977
  Farm to Market Road 3345

Airports

The sole publicly owned airport in the county is Sugar Land Regional Airport in Sugar Land.

Privately owned airports for public use include:
 Houston Fort Bend Airport in an unincorporated area east of Beasley
 Houston Southwest Airport in Arcola
 Westheimer Air Park in an unincorporated area between Fulshear and Houston

Privately owned for private use:
 Cardiff Brothers Airport in an unincorporated area near Fulshear and Katy
 Dewberry Heliport is a general-aviation heliport (privately owned, for private use) in unincorporated areas between Fulshear and Katy.

The closest airport with regularly scheduled commercial service is Houston's William P. Hobby Airport in Harris County. Fort Bend County is also within the primary service area of George Bush Intercontinental Airport in Houston.

Mass transit
Fort Bend County officially created a department of public transportation in 2005 that provides commuter buses to Uptown, Greenway Plaza, and Texas Medical Center. It also provides demand-and-response buses to senior citizens and the general public that travel only in Fort Bend County. Parts of the county, such as Katy and Missouri City, participate in the Metropolitan Transit Authority of Harris County and are served by several park-and-ride routes.

Freeway system
The TTC-69 component (recommended preferred) of the once-planned Trans-Texas Corridor went through Fort Bend County.

Toll roads
The Fort Bend County Toll Road Authority in Sugar Land manages and operates tolled portions of these toll roads operating in the county:
 Fort Bend Parkway
 Westpark Tollway
 Grand Parkway Toll Road

Notable people
Brittney Karbowski, American voice actress 
CeeDee Lamb, Wide Receiver for the Dallas Cowboys

See also

 List of museums in the Texas Gulf Coast
 National Register of Historic Places listings in Fort Bend County, Texas
 Recorded Texas Historic Landmarks in Fort Bend County

References

External links

 Fort Bend County official website 
 Fort Bend Museum Web site
 
 Fort Bend County profile from The County Information Project

 
1838 establishments in the Republic of Texas
Populated places established in 1838
Greater Houston
Majority-minority counties in Texas